Today I Hang is a 1942 American film directed by Oliver Drake and produced and released by Producers Releasing Corporation. The plot concerns a man who is framed for the murder of a wealthy importer and the theft of a valuable necklace. The victim's widow doesn't believe he is guilty and sets out to prove his innocence.

This film is in the public domain.

Cast 
Walter Woolf King as Jim O'Brien
Mona Barrie as Martha Courtney
William Farnum as Warden Burke
Harry Woods as Henry Courtney
James Craven as Joseph Rand
Michael Raffetto as Roger Lanning
Sam Bernard as Slick Pheeney
Robert Fiske as Det. Johnson
Paul Scardon as Hobbs

References

External links 

1942 films
1942 crime drama films
American mystery drama films
American black-and-white films
Producers Releasing Corporation films
American crime drama films
1940s mystery drama films
Films directed by Oliver Drake
1940s English-language films
1940s American films